Alfred Henry Thesiger PC QC (15 July 1838 – 20 October 1880), styled The Hon. Alfred Thesiger from 1858 to 1877 and The Rt Hon. Lord Justice Thesiger from 1877, was a British lawyer and judge.

Early life
Thesiger was the third son of Lord Chancellor Frederic Thesiger, 1st Baron Chelmsford, by his wife Anna Maria (née Tinling). He played one first-class cricket match for the Marylebone Cricket Club in 1861.

Career
He was Attorney-General to the Prince of Wales and was appointed a Queen's Counsel in 1873. In 1877, at the age of 37, he was made a Lord Justice of Appeal and sworn of the Privy Council.

In the summer of 1877 Thesiger, took on the Arbitration of Doctor Thomas Barnardo as his legal counsel at the behest of the Evangelical Lord Chancellor, Lord Cairns. (p. 105 "Slumming" Seth Koven)

Judgments
The Household Fire and Carriage Accident Insurance Company (Limited) v Grant (1878–79) LR 4 Ex D 216 - English contract law concerning the "postal rule", and containing an important dissenting judgment by Bramwell LJ, who wished to dispose of it.
Wheeldon v Burrows 1879) LR 12 Ch D 31; [1874-90] All ER Rep. 669; (1879) 48 LJ Ch 853; (1879) 41 LT 327 - English land law case on the implying of grant easements. The case established one of the three current methods by which an easement can be acquired by implied grant
Sturges v Bridgman (1879) LR 11 Ch D 852 – reasonable use of property depends on the character of the locality and arguing that the plaintiff "came to the nuisance" is not a defence.

Family
His sister, Julia (1833–1904) was married to Sir John Eardley Wilmot Inglis (1814–1862) who commanded the British forces during the Siege of Lucknow in 1857. She later wrote of her experiences during the siege including extracts from her diary.

Thesiger married Henrietta, daughter of the Hon. George Handcock, in 1862. They had no children. He died in October 1880, aged 42. He is buried in Brompton Cemetery, London. Henrietta Thesiger died in February 1921.

References

Attribution:

1838 births
1880 deaths
Burials at Brompton Cemetery
Lords Justices of Appeal
Younger sons of barons
19th-century British people
English cricketers
Marylebone Cricket Club cricketers
Members of the Privy Council of the United Kingdom
English King's Counsel
Alfred